This is a list of Brazilian football transfers for the 2014 winter transfer window. Only moves featuring at least one Campeonato Brasileiro Série A or Campeonato Brasileiro Série B club are listed. This list also includes transfers which were completed after the end of the summer 2013–14 transfer window and before the end of the 2014 winter window.

The Brazilian winter transfer window opened on 14 July and closed at 23:59 UTC-03:00 on 13 August, being valid for international transfers. Domestic transfers are free to occur throughout the season. It is worth noting that in Brazil the winter occurs in half of year, while the summer occurs in the New Year.

Transfers
All players and clubs without a flag are Brazilian. The international transfers for Brazilian clubs are only valid as from the window opening, on 14 July.

References

External links
Brazilian football transfers winter 2014. Globo Esporte.
Brazilian football transfers winter 2014. UOL Esportes.

Transfers
2014
Brazil